Sir Thomas Denton (died 1633) was an English landowner and politician who sat in the House of Commons between 1604 and 1629.

Denton was the eldest son of Alexander Denton of Hillesden and his wife Mary Martin, daughter of Sir Roger Martin, Lord Mayor of London. He succeeded his father in 1576. Following his marriage in 1594, he lived at Stowe, Buckinghamshire, and in 1601, he was High Sheriff of the county. He was knighted by the King at Salden, in July 1603.

In 1604, Denton was elected Member of Parliament for Buckingham. He was re-elected MP for Buckingham in 1614, when on  3 June 1614 he brought in a bill into the House of Commons to fix the Summer Assizes at the Town of Buckingham. In 1624 he was elected MP for Buckinghamshire and was re-elected for Buckinghamshire in 1626. In 1628 he was elected MP for Buckingham  again and sat until 1629 when King Charles decided to rule without parliament for eleven years.

Denton died at Hillesden and was buried there on 23 September 1633.

In 1594 Denton married Susan Temple, daughter of John Temple of Stowe and sister of Sir Thomas Temple. He was succeeded by his son Alexander. His daughter Margaret married Sir Edmund Verney.

References

Year of birth missing
1633 deaths
High Sheriffs of Buckinghamshire
Place of birth missing
English MPs 1604–1611
English MPs 1614
English MPs 1621–1622
English MPs 1624–1625
English MPs 1626
English MPs 1628–1629